The Group Sports Club is a Maldivian basketball team.

Achievements 

 2007 : 15th, MBA Championship 
Men's Division 1 
Runner-up

 2007 : 15th, MBA Championship 
Women's Division 
Champion

 2007 : 2nd, MBA Invitational Championship 2006 
Men's Division 1 
Runner-up

 2006 : 14th, MBA Championship 
Women's Division 
Runner-up

 2006 : 26th, National Basketball Tournament 
Men's Division 1 
Champion

 2006 : 26th, National Basketball Tournament 
Men's Division 2 
Champion

 2006 : 26th, National Basketball Tournament 
Women's Division 
Runner-up

External links
 Club entry – Maldives Basketball Association

Basketball teams established in 2006
Basketball teams in the Maldives
Organizations established in 2006